Agdal is a village in Rewa district of Madhya Pradesh state of India.

References

Villages in Rewa district